The RealDoll is a life-size sex doll (also considered a mannequin) manufactured by Abyss Creations, LLC in Las Vegas, Nevada, and sold worldwide.  It has a poseable PVC skeleton with steel joints and silicone flesh.

Details and history
The RealDolls are designed to recreate the appearance, texture, and weight of human female and male bodies. Their primary function is to serve as sex partners. This activity can be accompanied by certain preparations such as dressing them up in different types of clothes, changing wigs or makeup, and even adjusting body temperature by the use of electric blankets or baths.

Early prototypes were made from solid latex with an interior skeleton, but construction of the outer material was later switched to silicone. In June 2009, Abyss Creations switched from tin cure silicone to platinum silicone, which resulted in dolls that are less prone to tears and compression marks than older RealDolls.  

The current incarnation of the female Real Doll product was introduced in 1996. In 2003, Abyss introduced the "Face-X" system, allowing any face to be interchangeable with any body. Multiple faces can then be attached once at a time to a single doll by the owner.  As of 2011, there are nine female bodies and 16 female faces in the first product line. In 2009 the RealDoll 2 was introduced, which feature removable inserts for the mouth and vagina and faces that attach by magnets instead of Velcro.  The line started with two female bodies and three female faces and, as of 2013, offered ten faces and three bodies of females. Another female body is in the development phase.

Charlie, the first male Real Doll, was retired in 2008 and replaced with two body types and three head types. Transgender dolls may also be purchased from the company, although these must be custom ordered. Abyss also sells silicone toys such as female torso products and dildos among other offerings.

For a time, the company also offered customizations such as robotic hip actuators, finger skeletons (instead of the usual wire finger armatures), and computer-controlled speech feedback, but these expensive options are no longer available.

In popular culture
A Cyanide & Happiness short, in which Pinocchio exclaims "I want to be a RealDoll!".
 A film entitled Love Object starring Desmond Harrington was released in 2003 that deals with a lonely man's purchase of a RealDoll that may be more real than he thinks.
 Dave Hockey's All Dolled Up documentary
 Glamour and high fashion photographer Helmut Newton photographed RealDolls. A sample can be found in his autobiography. Playboy magazine reportedly refused to publish Newton's RealDoll photo shoot, considering it too weird, according to his account.
 Nick Holt's Guys and Dolls television documentary for North One Television (renamed "Love Me, Love My Doll" for broadcast on BBC America) follows the lives of four men who live with RealDolls.
 On the Family Guy episode "Boopa-dee Bappa-dee" the Griffins pose as RealDolls in order to re-enter the United States. Additionally in the episode "Take a Letter" Cleveland reveals that a large empty warehouse at the post office is in preparation for the near future when RealDolls are a popular mail-order item.
RealDolls are also referenced in the lyrics of "Lower Your Expectations," a song by Bo Burnham featured in his Netflix-exclusive stand-up comedy special: Make Happy.
RealDolls are mentioned in the lyrics of the song "Crockpot" by an American rock band Slothrust.
 Several lifestyle magazines featured reports focusing on people who own RealDolls.
 The mainstream film Lars and the Real Girl features a RealDoll as second main character.

See also
 Agalmatophilia
 Galatea (mythology)
 Gynoid
 Pygmalion (mythology)
 Robot fetishism
 Uncanny valley
 Weird Science (film)

References

External links
 

Sex dolls